Wang Lina may refer to:

Wang Lina (boxer) (born 1997), Chinese boxer
Wang Lina (long jumper) (born 1983), Chinese long jumper
Wang Lina (sport shooter) (born 1971), Chinese pistol shooter
Wang Lina (volleyball) (born 1978), Chinese volleyball team outside hitter